Kevin Michael Collins (born March 17, 1972 in Trenton, New Jersey) is an American-Irish stage and screen actor of Irish-Italian descent.

Collins is an alumnus of St. Michael's College at the University of Toronto and a graduate of the National Theatre School of Canada and the Ecole de Mime Corporel Dramatique in London. He was a member of the Irish company Blue Raincoat and of the London-based corporeal mime company Theatre de l'Ange Fou.

In theatre he has worked in the West End, with the Peter Hall Company, and off-Broadway, most notably at the Irish Repertory Theatre.   On film he has appeared in Everybody's Fine, Baby Mama, Jamil Dehlavi's Infinite Justice and Munich, directed by Steven Spielberg. His television appearances include Unforgettable, Law & Order, All My Children, Gossip Girl, Person of Interest and The Black List.

Collins is also a voiceover artist whose voice is regularly heard in national ad campaigns in the United States, Canada, the UK and Ireland. As a voice actor, his credits include work for RTÉ and BBC radio drama, and documentary narration.

He also acted in Just Cause 3, taking the main role as Rico Rodriguez.

Filmography

Film
 Baby Mama as Rick
 Infinite Justice as Arnold Silverman
 Munich as American Athlete

Television
 Guiding Light as Dr. Brandon Cohen

Videogame
DC Universe Online - Thomas Wayne
Just Cause 3 - Rico Rodriguez
''SRS: Street Racing Syndicate -

References

External links
Official website: www.kevincollins.com

Voiceover clips

1972 births
American male stage actors
American male film actors
American male television actors
Living people